The adjutative voice is a grammatical voice carrying the meaning "to help to". The subject of a verb in the adjutative voice is not an agent of the action denoted by the verb, but assists the (unstated) agent in performing the action.

References

Grammatical voices